This is a list of bogs, wetland mires that accumulate peat from dead plant material, usually sphagnum moss. Bogs are sometimes called quagmires (technically all bogs are quagmires while not all quagmires are necessarily bogs) and the soil which composes them is sometimes referred to as muskeg; alkaline mires are called fens rather than bogs.

Locations of bogs

Europe

Czech Republic 
Modravské Slatě - a bog in the Šumava region of the Czech Republic
Rejvíz - a Moravian-Silesian peat bog with small lakes in the Czech Republic

Estonia 

Emajõe-Suursoo - a large swampland around the river Emajõgi
Kakerdaja Bog - in Albu Parish
Kuresoo Bog in Soomaa National Park - a largest bog in Estonia ("Soomaa" means "Bogland")
Niitvälja Bog - is a fen in Harju County 
Nigula Bog - a nature reserve in Pärnu County
Viru Bog - a bog in Lahemaa National Park in Harju County
Puhatu Bog - a vast swamp area located in Ida-Viru County

Latvia 
Ķemeri National Park Bog - a popular tourist destination

Germany 
Bornrieth Moor - an old peat bog in the district of Celle in Lower Saxony
Bullenkuhle
Großes Moor - a lake in Mecklenburg-Vorpommern in East Germany
Großes Moor - a moor on the Lüneburg Heath near Becklingen
Großes Moor - a raised peat bog near Gifhorn in Lower Saxony
Großes Moor - a large bogland in Lower Saxony and North Rhine-Westphalia
Großes Torfmoor - a raised peat bog in the northeast of the state of North Rhine-Westphalia in Germany
Grundloses Moor
Kiehnmoor
Lütt-Witt Moor - a bog in Henstedt-Ulzburg in northern Germany
Maujahn Moor - a kettle bog near Dannenberg in Lower Saxony
Oppenweher Moor
Ostenholz Moor
Pietzmoor
Teufelsmoor
Thorsberg moor - a bog near Süderbrarup in Anglia, Schleswig-Holstein, Germany
Tiste Bauernmoor
Vehmsmoor

Ireland 
Bog of Allen - a large peat bog in the centre of Ireland
Boora Bog - cutaway peat bog in County Offaly, Ireland
Clara Bog - a raised bog in County Offaly, Ireland
Raheenmore Bog - a raised bog in County Offaly, Ireland
Ballynagrenia and Ballinderry Bog, small bog in County Westmeath, Ireland
Carn Park Bog, small bog in County Westmeath, Ireland
Clareisland Bog, small bog in County Westmeath, Ireland 
Cloncrow Bog, small bog in County Westmeath, Ireland 
Clonydonnin Bog, small bog in County Westmeath, Ireland 
Crosswood Bog, small bog in County Westmeath, Ireland 
Garriskil Bog, small bog in County Westmeath, Ireland 
Lough Derravaragh Bog, small bog in County Westmeath, Ireland 
Lough Garr Bog, small bog in County Westmeath, Ireland 
Milltownpass Bog, small bog in County Westmeath, Ireland 
Moneybeg Bog, small bog in County Westmeath, Ireland 
Mount Hevey Bog, small bog in County Westmeath, Ireland 
Nure Bog, small bog in County Westmeath, Ireland
Scargh Bog, small bog in County Westmeath, Ireland
Wooddown Bog, small bog in County Westmeath, Ireland
Ballykenny-Fisherstown Bog, bog in County Longford, Ireland
Aghnamona Bog, bog in County Leitrim and County Longford, Ireland
Cashel Bog, bog in County Leitrim, Ireland
Cloonageeher Bog, bog in County Leitrim and County Longford, Ireland
Corracramph Bog, bog in County Leitrim, Ireland
Corry Mountain Bog, bog in County Leitrim and County Roscommon, Ireland

Nordic countries 
Lille Vildmose - a peat bog near Aalborg, Denmark
Bockstens Mosse - a bog in Halland County, Sweden
Borremose - a raised bog in central Himmerland, Denmark.
Hirvisuo Bog - a bog near Oulu, Finland
Laponian area - the mires in Sjaunja Nature Reserve, Muddus National Park and Stubba Nature Reserve, part of the Laponian area, together form one of Europe's largests bogs, Sweden
Store Mosse - national park with the largest boggy grounds south of Lapland, Sweden
Tavvavuoma - arctic tundra with palsa mires, Sweden

Switzerland 

 List of raised and transitional bogs of Switzerland

United Kingdom
Astley and Bedford Mosses - peat located in Astley, Greater Manchester
Ballynahone Bog - a raised bog and the largest in Northern Ireland
Carrington Moss - peat bog located in Trafford, Greater Manchester
Chat Moss - peat bog located in Salford, Greater Manchester 
Cors Caron - peat bog near Tregaron, Ceredigion, Wales
Cors Fochno - peat bog near Borth, Ceredigion, Wales
Crymlyn Bog - a nature reserve near Swansea, Wales
Fenn's, Whixall and Bettisfield Mosses - a national nature reserve which straddles the border between England and Wales
Flanders Moss - a national nature reserve and the largest lowland raised bog in Britain; west of Stirling, Scotland
Fleet Moss - a large peat blanket bog in the Yorkshire Dales, North Yorkshire, England
Flow Country - the largest expanse of blanket bog in Europe - Caithness and Sutherland, Scotland
Lenzie Moss - a boggy, marshy area in Lenzie, East Dunbartonshire, Scotland.
Lindow Moss - an ancient peat bog west of Wilmslow, Cheshire. Bog body of Lindow Man was discovered there in 1983
Matley Bog - an ancient woodland bog in the New Forest, Hampshire, England
Max Bog - a biological Site of Special Scientific Interest west of the village of Winscombe, North Somerset, in England
Migneint - a large expanse of blanket bog in southern Snowdonia in Wales
Moine Mhor ("Great Moss") - a national nature reserve managed by Scottish Natural Heritage near Kilmartin, Scotland
Moseley Bog - a nature reserve in the Moseley area of Birmingham in England
Portlethen Moss - a nature reserve in northeast Scotland
Red Moss of Netherley - a bog in Netherley, Aberdeenshire, Scotland
Red Moss - a wetland bog located in Horwich, Greater Manchester 
Rannoch Moor - an expanse of around 50 square miles (130 km2) of boggy moorland to the west of Loch Rannoch in Scotland
Wem Moss - an almost pristine part of the same British moss complex as Fenn's, Whixall and Bettisfield mosses, but isolated from them by agricultural land
Yanal Bog - a biological Site of Special Scientific Interest on the southern edge of the North Somerset Levels in England

Americas

Canada
Alfred Bog - a dome bog in eastern Ontario, Canada sphagnum bog east of Ottawa in eastern Ontario
The Bog - a putrescent lowland in Saint-Henri, Quebec known for its diverse array of toads and squires
Burns Bog - in British Columbia, the largest domed peat bog in North America
Eagle Hill Bog - A small spaghnum bog on Campobello Island, New Brunswick
Johnville Bog & Forest Park - Sherbrooke, Quebec, a sphagnum bog
Kennedy River Bog Provincial Park - a provincial park in British Columbia, Canada
Mer Bleue Conservation Area - a sphagnum bog east of Ottawa in eastern Ontario
Sifton Bog in London, Ontario

United States
Black Spruce Bog Natural Area - a national natural landmark in Michigan's Waterloo State Recreation Area
Big Bog State Recreation Area - a recent addition to the Minnesota state park system
Quaking Bog - 5-acre acid bog tucked into the wooded hills of Theodore Wirth Park on the western edge of Minneapolis, Minnesota
The Bog Garden - a nature preserve, botanical garden, and city park located in Greensboro, North Carolina
Brown’s Lake Bog - in Wayne County, Ohio, one of the few remaining kettle peatlands in the U.S. state of Ohio. It has a kettle lake, kame, and a floating sphagnum moss mat.
Cedar Bog Nature Preserve - in Urbana, Ohio, a glacial relic due to conditions creating a microclimate that has allowed the survival of plant associations similar to those in northern Michigan
Cranberry Glades - Pocahontas County, West Virginia
Glacier Park Bog - a small bog located near Greenwood, Illinois
Heath Pond Bog - a sphagnum bog in Ossipee New Hampshire 
Ink Blot Natural Area Preserve - a sphagnum bog in western Washington
Joseph Pines Preserve - a longleaf pine and pitcher plant/sphagnum bog nature preserve in southern Virginia 
Massawepie Mire - the largest peatland in New York
McLean Bogs - two small kettle bogs located in Dryden, New York; one acidic and one alkaline. (restricted public access)
Minden Bog - 9,000 acre raised bog, Sanilac County, Michigan
Pinhook Bog - a nature preserve in northwest Indiana, a part of Indiana Dunes National Lakeshore
Rhine Center Bog, Sheboygan County, Wisconsin 
Ranger Lake Bog, at Bay-Lakes Cub Scout Camp Rokilio, Manitowoc County, near Kiel, Wisconsin, 18.5 acre acidic bog
Spruce Hole Bog - a complete ecological community occupying a true kettle hole in Strafford County, New Hampshire
Spruce Flats Bog - formed in a natural depression following excessive logging atop Laurel Ridge, part of the Allegheny Mountains, in Westmoreland County, Pennsylvania
Stillwater Bog - a sphagnum bog in Snoqualmie, Washington. Home to threatened species such as few-flowered sedge, mountain bladderwort, and state-candidate Beller's ground beetle.
Tannersville Cranberry Bog - a sphagnum bog in Pennsylvania
Tom S. Cooperrider-Kent Bog State Nature Preserve - A  bog in Kent, Ohio
Saco Heath Preserve - a nature preserve in Saco, Maine
Hawley Bog Preserve - a nature preserve and a well preserved unspoiled New England bog in Hawley, Massachusetts
Strangmoor Bog - a national natural landmark in Michigan's Upper Peninsula
Volo Bog - a nature preserve in Illinois
Zurich Bog - a national natural landmark in Arcadia, New York
West Hylebos Wetlands Park in Federal Way, Washington

Asia
The world's largest peat bog, located in Western Siberia, is thawing for the first time in 11,000 years (see Peat#Environmental and ecological issues)

Oceania

New Zealand 

 Moanatuatua - a remnant of a large restiad raised bog located south of Hamilton, Waikato
 Kopuatai - the largest raised bog in New Zealand. Formed from restiad plant species and a designated Ramsar site

References

See also 

Differences between bogs and other wetlands
Muskeg
Fen
Bog body
Bog iron
Bog snorkelling
List of bog bodies

Types of soil